Kau Liu Ha is a village in Lam Tsuen, Tai Po District, Hong Kong.

Administration
Kau Liu Ha is a recognized village under the New Territories Small House Policy.

References

External links
 Delineation of area of existing village Kau Liu Ha (Tai Po) for election of resident representative (2019 to 2022)

Villages in Tai Po District, Hong Kong
Lam Tsuen